Lorenzo Mathiot (born 1977) is a Seychellois footballer. He played as a defender on the Seychelles national football team.

External links

1977 births
Living people
Seychellois footballers
Place of birth missing (living people)
Association football defenders
Seychelles international footballers
Date of birth missing (living people)
20th-century Seychellois people